Stick with You may refer to:

"Stick with You", a song by Zara Larsson from her 2021 album Poster Girl
"Stickwitu", a 2005 song by Pussycat Dolls